Euston tunnel is a tunnel currently planned in London that will carry the High Speed 2 (HS2) railway between Euston railway station and Old Oak Common railway station.

Work to prepare the site for construction was undertaken in the late 2010s, such as the clearance of the old carriage sheds near Euston station in 2018. A legal challenge to the tunnel's design was defeated in mid-2020. During October 2020, HS2 Ltd ordered the two tunnel boring machines (TBMs) from Herrenknecht that will excavate the tunnel. Excavation is scheduled to take place between 2022 and 2024.

History
To bring the HS2 high speed line into London, it was decided that a series of twin-bore tunnels underneath the city would be the most practical approach. Responsibility for the construction of the section between central London and the M25 has been assigned to HS2's main works contractor, Skanska Costain STRABAG JV.

During 2018, the disused Euston Downside Carriage Maintenance Depot, close to Euston railway station, was demolished in order to clear space for the future construction work; the tunnel portal of the future Euston tunnel is to be present at this location.

During 2019, a legal challenge to the design of Euston tunnel was launched by a local resident, alleging failures to address safety concerns; in June 2020, the High Court dismissed the challenge as "impossible to accept".

During October 2020, HS2 Ltd signed a contract with the manufacturing group Herrenknecht to build and supply the two TBMs for Euston tunnel. These are to be custom-designed to suit the local geology, which ground surveys indicated to consist largely of clay and chalk, with which the tunnels are to be bored through. Delivery of the two TBMs has been scheduled to take place sometime in late 2021.

In summer 2022, initial boring is expected to take place; this phase of the work is expected to take roughly two years to complete. Boring is set to proceed on a non-stop working pattern, only shutting down temporarily on Christmas and for bank holidays. During the excavation phase, it has been projected that  of spoil (excavated material), weighing 2.46milliontonnes, will be removed by the TBMs. Between August 2021 and December 2033, a portion of London Zoo's car park is to be temporarily borrowed for use by construction vehicles while Euston Tunnel is being built.

Construction
Euston tunnel will be bored using tunnel boring machines launched from the western entrance, near Old Oak Common railway station.

The pre-cast concrete sections lining  the tunnel will be manufactured by Pacadar UK at their factory on the Isle of Grain, Kent. These sections, each weighing seven tonnes, will be transported to  site by rail. The use of 3D printing technology will reportedly reduce the amount of concrete used in Euston tunnel in comparison to traditional methods.

One of the few above-surface elements of the tunnel will be a three-storey building near Euston railway station, adjacent to the existing West Coast Main Line, which will accommodate a  diameter ventilation shaft from the surface to the twin tunnels below; this structure will also facilitate emergency access to the tunnel along with supporting electrical plant rooms. The top of this building will be covered by a green roof, stone-paved courtyard and have an entrance from Park Village East.

References

Railway tunnels in London
High Speed 2